William Marshall was a Scottish rugby football player.

He also played for Edinburgh Academicals.

He was the brother of Thomas Roger Marshall who was also capped for Scotland.

References
 Bath, Richard (ed.) The Scotland Rugby Miscellany (Vision Sports Publishing Ltd, 2007 )

Scottish rugby union players
Scotland international rugby union players
Edinburgh Academicals rugby union players
Year of birth missing
Year of death missing